Back in the USA is the debut studio album (and second album overall, following 1969's live album Kick Out the Jams) by American rock band MC5.

Background 

The central focus of the album is the band's movement away from the raw, thrashy sound pioneered and captured on their first release, the live album Kick Out the Jams (1969). This was due in part to producer Jon Landau's distaste for the rough psychedelic rock movement, and his adoration for the straightforward rock and roll of the 1950s.

Landau, who originally wrote for Rolling Stone magazine, was looking to get more involved in actual music production. Becoming close with Atlantic Records executive Jerry Wexler was his chance and led Landau to the politically radical MC5, who had just been picked up by Atlantic after being dropped from Elektra Records in 1969 – the Kinney National Company (later known as Time Warner), parent of Atlantic, acquired Elektra in the same year of this album's release; both labels are now part of the Warner Music Group (now a separate company from TW), through the Atlantic Records Group.

Content 

The opening track is a cover of the classic hit "Tutti Frutti" by Little Richard. "Let Me Try" is a ballad. "The American Ruse" attacks what the Detroit quintet saw as the hypocritical idea of freedom espoused by the US government, and "The Human Being Lawnmower" expresses opposition to the US involvement in the Vietnam War. The last song on the album, which is the title track, is a cover of Chuck Berry's 1959 single "Back in the U.S.A."

Release and reception 

Reviewing Back in the USA for Rolling Stone in 1970, Greil Marcus admired the album's "attempt to define themes and problems and an offering of political, social, and emotional solutions", but found that "the music, the sound, and in the end the care with which these themes have been shaped drags it down, save for two or three fine numbers that deserve to be played on every jukebox in the land". Though the album was viewed as a flop early on by most fans, and lacked the commercial success of their previous release, it would later be considered highly important due to the album's absolute projection of MC5's core sound and earliest influences.

In his retrospective review, Jason Ankeny of AllMusic wrote, "While lacking the monumental impact of Kick Out the Jams, the MC5's second album is in many regards their best and most influential".

Legacy 

In 2012, Back in the USA was ranked number 446 on Rolling Stones list of the 500 greatest albums of all time. The following year, NME placed the album at number 490 on its own similar list.

Jason Ankeny of AllMusic commented that "[the album's] lean, edgy sound anticipat[ed] the emergence of both the punk and power pop movements to follow later in the decade."

Track listing

Personnel 
MC5
 Rob Tyner – vocals
 Wayne Kramer – guitar, vocals on first & third chorus of "Back in the USA", guitar solos on "Tutti Frutti", "Teenage Lust" and "Looking at You"
 Fred "Sonic" Smith – guitar, guitar solo on "The American Ruse", lead vocals on "Shakin' Street" and second chorus of "Back in the USA"
 Michael Davis – bass
 Dennis Thompson – drums

 Additional personnel
 Danny Jordan – keyboards

 Technical
 Jon Landau – production
 Jim Bruzzese – engineer
 Stephen Paley – art direction, cover photography 
 Joan Marker – design

References

External links 

 

1970 debut albums
MC5 albums
Albums produced by Jon Landau
Atlantic Records albums